Tyler Pierce (born October 12, 1998) is an American former figure skater. She has won two medals on the ISU Challenger Series – bronze at the 2015 Ice Challenge and 2015 Tallinn Trophy. She is the 2014 U.S. national junior silver medalist.

Personal life 
Pierce was born on October 12, 1998 in Whittier, California. The daughter of Sharon and Larry Pierce, she trained in gymnastics until the age of nine and has expressed interest in a career as a chef.

Career 
Pierce won gold on the novice level at the 2013 U.S. Championships.

At the start of the 2013–14 season, Pierce was sent to the ISU Junior Grand Prix in Estonia and finished 6th. After winning the junior silver medal at the 2014 U.S. Championships, she was named in the U.S. team to the 2014 World Junior Championships in Sofia, Bulgaria. She finished 14th overall after placing 10th in the short program and 14th in the free skate.

Pierce placed 7th competing on the senior level at the 2015 U.S. Championships and was selected to compete at the 2015 World Junior Championships in Tallinn, Estonia. Ranked 19th in the short and 22nd in the free, she finished 19th overall.

Making her senior international debut, Pierce placed fourth at the 2015 Skate Canada Autumn Classic before winning bronze medals at a pair of ISU Challenger Series (CS) events, the 2015 Ice Challenge and 2015 Tallinn Trophy. After placing fifth in senior ladies' at the 2016 U.S. Championships, she competed at the 2016 World Junior Championships in Debrecen, Hungary; she placed 7th in the short, 6th in the free, and 6th overall.

Pierce was invited to a Grand Prix event, the 2016 Trophée de France, but withdrew due to a lumbar sprain.

Programs

Competitive highlights 
GP: Grand Prix; CS: Challenger Series; JGP: Junior Grand Prix

References

External links 
 
 Tyler Pierce at IceNetwork.com

1998 births
American female single skaters
Living people
People from Whittier, California
People from Norco, California
21st-century American women